Liverpool Exchange by-election may refer to:

1887 Liverpool Exchange by-election
1897 Liverpool Exchange by-election
1922 Liverpool Exchange by-election
1933 Liverpool Exchange by-election